"Shouting Out Love" is a song recorded by R&B group the Emotions issued as a single in October 1977 by Stax Records. The single rose to No. 12 on the Cashbox Top R&B Songs chart and No. 31 on the Billboard Hot Soul Songs chart.

Overview
"Shouting Out Love" was composed by Carl Smith and produced by Al Bell, William Brown and Marvell Thomas. The song also came off The Emotions' 1977 album Sunshine

Critical reception
Andrew Hamilton of Allmusic described Shouting Out Love as a song with "a good beat, a great hook, and sensational vocals."

Appearances in other media
The song appeared on the soundtrack of the 2012 feature film The Sapphires.

Charts

References

1977 songs
1977 singles
The Emotions songs
Stax Records singles